El Cuartel de la Risa was a Puerto Rican comedy show broadcast on WSTE. It was one of the most successful comedy shows during its run.

The show revolved around what happened in a generic police station in the fictional town of Trujillo Bajo, Puerto Rico. El Gangster and Rafael José personified two detectives (a la Miami Vice), Carmen Dominicci and Kate Garrity were two female officers, while Pucho Fernández was an old and dumb officer. The Puerto Rican Vedette Lourdes Chacón had a recurring role as the reporter "Clarita" and appeared in several episodes. The show lasted 7 years on the air (3 with the show and five on reruns). This was Supersiete's last original sitcom to air on the channel before being bought to Teleonce. This comedy was created and produced by Vicky Hernandez.

El Cuartel de la Risa was written by Kate Garrity, and at a later date, Pucho Fernandez also contributed. She was part of the directing team which included Walter Rodriguez and Gurin Belgoderes. There were several guest appearances, including Machuchal, Tita Guerrero, Lourdes Chacon, and many others. Two actors played District Attorneys, one being Jaime Ruiz Escobar and acted as love interests for Kate's character. Garrity cast herself as "La Capitana" in charge of the Cuartel which she later noted was a big help given the level of laughter, fun and jokes that were part of taping the program.

References

Puerto Rican television series
Television shows set in Puerto Rico